Mladen "Cipi" Kocić (born 22 October 1988), is a Serbian futsal player who plays for Russian club Tyumen and the Serbia national futsal team. He also represented Serbia national futsal team at UEFA Futsal Euro 2016 in Serbia.

Career
Kocić before his futsal career playing for Radnički and OFK Niš. He started to play futsal with 18 years in the Kopernikus, that after only six months moved to Ekonomac. With Ekonomac won six championship titles of Serbia, three Serbian Cup and one Balkan Cup. For six seasons he amassed 30 appearances and 14 goals in UEFA competitions. 2014 moved to Nacional. 
After 2 season with Nacional, in summer 2016 Kocić joined to MFK Tyumen.

Honours
Ekonomac
 Serbian Prva Futsal Liga (7): 2007–08, 2008–09, 2009–10, 2010–11, 2011–12, 2012–13, 2013–14
 Serbian Futsal Cup (3): 2009–10, 2012–13, 2013–14
 Balkan Futsal Cup (1): 2008

Nacional
 Croatian Prva HMNL (2): 2014–15, 2015–16

References

External links
UEFA profile
MNK Nacional Zagreb profile

1988 births
Living people
Futsal forwards
Serbian men's futsal players
Sportspeople from Niš
Serbian expatriate sportspeople in Croatia
Serbian expatriate sportspeople in Russia